Shankar Mahadevan (born 3 March 1967) is an Indian singer and composer who is part of the Shankar–Ehsaan–Loy trio that writes music for Indian films.

Personal life and early career
Shankar Mahadevan was born in Chembur, Mumbai into a Tamil speaking family from Palakkad, Kerala. He learned Hindustani classical and Carnatic music as a child, and began playing the veena at the age of five under Shri Lalitha Venkataraman. Mahadevan studied music under Pandit Shrinivas Khale and T.R. Balamani.

He is an alumnus of Our Lady of Perpetual Succour High School, Chembur and graduated in 1988 with a degree in Computer Science and Software Engineering from the Ramrao Adik Institute of Technology in Navi Mumbai, affiliated to Mumbai University, and was a software engineer for the company, Leading Edge. After working for Leading Edge Systems (now Trigyn Technologies Limited), Mahadevan ventured into music.

Siddharth Mahadevan is the son of Shankar Mahadevan and he is also a singer.

Musical career
Mahadevan got early fame as an indipop star with his fusion of Carnatic, Hindustani and Jazz. At that time, his non-film album, Breathless topped the Indian music charts in 1998.

Awards
 2000: National Film Award for Best Male Playback Singer - "Yenna Solla Pogirai" (Kandukondain Kandukondain)
 2007: Swaralaya-Kairali-Yesudas Award for outstanding contribution to Indian film music
 2007: National Film Award for Best Male Playback Singer - "Maa" (Taare Zameen Par)
 2008: Kerala State Film Award for Best Male Playback Singer - "Kalyana Kacheri" (Madampi)
 2009: Asianet Film Award for Best Male Playback - "Pichavecha Naal" (Puthiya Mukham)
 2009: Annual Malayalam Movie Awards (Dubai) for Best Male Singer - "Pichavecha Naal" (Puthiya Mukham)
 2011: Lata Mangeshkar Award by Government of Andhra Pradesh
 2011: Kerala Film Critics Award for Best Male Playback Singer - "Indhumukhi Varumo" (Holidays)
 2012: MAA Music Award for Best Male Playback Singer - "Nee Dookudu" (Dookudu)
 2012: National Film Award for Best Male Playback Singer - "Bolo Na" (Chittagong)
 2015: Tulu Cinemotsava Awards for Best Playback Singer - Rikshaw Driver (Tulu Movie)

 2019: Padma Shri Award for his contributions to Film Music under the category Arts.

Filmography

As actor
 Aranmanai 3 (2021) Tamil - guest role in song "Theeyaga Thondri"
 Katyar Kaljat Ghusali (2015) Marathi
 Rhythm (2000) Tamil - guest role in song "thaniye"
 Ek Se Badh Kar Ek  (1995) Doordarshan Serial

As composer
 Rockford (1999)
 Bhopal Express (1999)
 Shool (1999)
 Dillagi (1999)
 Mission Kashmir (2000)
 Aalavandhan (2001) (Tamil)
 Dil Chahta Hai (2001)
 Yeh Kya Ho Raha Hai? (2002)
 Ek Aur Ek Gyarah (2003)
 Armaan (2003)
 Nayee Padosan (2003)
 Kuch Naa Kaho (2003)
 Kal Ho Naa Ho (2003)
 Rudraksh (2004)
 Kyun! Ho Gaya Na... (2004)
 Lakshya (2004)
 Phir Milenge (2004)
 Vanity Fair (2004)
 Bunty Aur Babli (2005)
 Dil Jo Bhi Kahey... (2005)
 Dus (2005)
 Kabhi Alvida Naa Kehna (2006)
 Don: The Chase Begins Again (2006)
 Salaam-e-Ishq: A Tribute to Love (2007)
 Marigold: An Adventure in India (2007)
 Heyy Babyy (2007)
 Jhoom Barabar Jhoom (2007)
 Johnny Gaddaar (2007)
 Taare Zameen Par (2007)
 High School Musical 2 soundtrack (Hindi version)
 Rock On!! (2008)
 Thoda Pyaar Thoda Magic (2008)
 Madambi (Malayalam) (2008)
 Chandni Chowk to China (2009)
 Yavarum Nalam (Tamil) (2009)
 Shortkut (2009)
 Luck by Chance (2009)
 Sikandar (2009)
 13B (2009)
 Konchem Ishtam Konchem Kashtam (Telugu) (2009)
 Wake Up Sid (2009)
 London Dreams (2009)
 My Name Is Khan (2010)
 Kismat Talkies (2010)
 Karthik Calling Karthik (2010)
 Hum Tum Aur Ghost (2010)
 Housefull (2010)
 Tere Bin Laden (2010)
 Koochie Koochie Hota Hai (2011)
 Patiala House (2011)
 De Ghuma Ke (World Cup 2011 song)
 Game (2011)
 Zindagi Na Milegi Dobara (2011)
 Don 2 (2011)
 Chittagong (2012)
 Vishwaroopam (2013)
 Bhaag Milkha Bhaag (2013)
 D - Day (2013)
 One By Two (2014)
 Darr @ the Mall (2014)
 2 States (2014)
 Kill Dil (2014)
 Mitwaa  (2015) Marathi
 Katyar Kaljat Ghusali (2015) Marathi
 Than Than Gopal  (2015) Marathi

As playback singer

Discography

Solo albums
 Nine
 Breathless

Jingles

Television
 Sa Re Ga Ma Pa L'il Champs 2022 as a judge
 Sa Re Ga Ma Pa :Sapnon Ki Shuruwaat as a Judge
 Taare Zameen Par as a Judge
 Rising Star Live on Colors as a Judge
 Indian Voice on Mazhavil Manorama as a Judge.
 Super Singer 6 & 7 as a Special Guest on Star Vijay
 Vijay Star Nite - Durban as a Performer in Durban on Star Vijay
 
 
 Super Singer Junior Season 6 & 7 on Star Vijay as a Judge
 Super Singer Champion of Champions on Star Vijay as a judge
 Super Singer 8 as a Performer & Judge along with other leading singers of Tamil (Hariharan, Sid Sriram, Unni Krishnan, Anuradha Sri Ram, Shasha Tirupati, Stephen Devassy, SPB Charan, Vijay Yesudas, Benny Dayal, Kalpana Ragavendar, Saindhavi, Shakthisree Gopalan, Pradeep Kumar, Vijay Prakash, Karthick, Gana Bala, Anthony Daasan, Chinnaponnu, Grace Karunas, Karunas) on the Grand Launch Episode on Star Vijay
 Sa Re Ga Ma Pa 2012 as a judge and mentor
 Music ka Maha Muqqabla as a contestant-captain of Shankar's Rockstars
 Sa Re Ga Ma Pa Challenge 2009 as a judge and mentor.

References

External links

 
 Shankar Mahadevan Academy
 

Singers from Mumbai
Indian male playback singers
Tamil film score composers
Tamil musicians
Living people
Tamil playback singers
Bollywood playback singers
Malayalam playback singers
Telugu playback singers
Musicians from Mumbai
Kannada playback singers
Marathi-language singers
Marathi playback singers
1967 births
Filmfare Awards South winners
Sanskrit-language singers
Hindi film score composers
Best Male Playback Singer National Film Award winners
Indian male film score composers
Recipients of the Padma Shri in arts
Remember Shakti members